Šmrekovac is a village in the municipality of Velika Kladuša, Bosnia and Herzegovina. It is located close to the Croatian border.

Demographics 
According to the 2013 census, its population was 288.

References

Populated places in Velika Kladuša